The 1908 United States presidential election in Massachusetts took place on November 3, 1908, as part of the 1908 United States presidential election. Voters chose 16 representatives, or electors to the Electoral College, who voted for president and vice president.

Massachusetts overwhelmingly voted for the Republican nominee, Secretary of War William Howard Taft, over the Democratic nominee, former U.S. Representative William Jennings Bryan. Taft won the state by a margin of 24.17%.

Taft was able to win every county in the state of Massachusetts, including a rare Republican victory in Suffolk County, home to the state's capital and largest city, Boston, although Bryan did narrowly win the city of Boston. Bryan had previously lost Suffolk County in 1896 but won it in his rematch with William McKinley in 1900.

Results

See also
 United States presidential elections in Massachusetts

References

Massachusetts
1908
1908 Massachusetts elections